Restaurant 9501 was the executive dining restaurant of ABS-CBN Corporation, located on the 14th floor of the ELJ Communications Center in Diliman, Quezon City, Philippines. It was conceptualized by award-winning Filipino chef Myrna Segismundo who acted as its managing director until 2015.

The name 9501 originated from the project name given to the ELJ Communications Center during its development and construction phase. It is owned and operated by TV Food Chefs, a subsidiary of ABS-CBN that also produces culinary TV shows, culinary magazines and books, and an annual culinary competition. It opened in 2001 exclusively to serve the executives of ABS-CBN and its guests. During this period, the restaurant did not charge its clients and instead relied on the budget allocated by ABS-CBN. The restaurant was later opened to all ABS-CBN employees and guests, while outside guests can also visit, by making reservations. Because its primary clients are company employees, the restaurant changes its menu from time to time. Restaurant 9501 was a popular venue for press conferences of local and international events due to its location in what is considered as the media capital of the Philippines.

Restaurant 9501 ceased its operations on August 31, 2020 as part of the retrenchment by ABS-CBN Corporation, due to denial of ABS-CBN's legislative franchise by the House of Representatives on July 10, 2020.

References

ABS-CBN Corporation
Assets owned by ABS-CBN Corporation
Quezon City
Restaurants in the Philippines
Defunct restaurants
Restaurants established in 2001
Restaurants disestablished in 2020
2001 establishments in the Philippines
2020 disestablishments in the Philippines